WEYA-LP was a low-power television station in Christiansted, U.S. Virgin Islands transmitting over analog channel 52. The station was founded in 2002 and was owned by Frontline Missions International, Inc.

WEYA-LP's first callsign was W52DG, and gained its current callsign on March 9, 2005. The station originally requested to operate on VHF channel 10, but was denied, given UHF channel 52 in its place.

The station's license was cancelled by the Federal Communications Commission on February 13, 2013, as it had not broadcast since December 31, 2011.

External links

FCCinfo.com
TVRadioWorld.com

EYA-LP
Defunct television stations in the United States
Television channels and stations disestablished in 2013
Television channels and stations established in 2002
2002 establishments in the United States Virgin Islands
2013 disestablishments in the United States Virgin Islands
EYA-LP